The Copa de la Reina de Baloncesto 2016 is the 54th edition of the Spanish Queen's Basketball Cup. It is managed by the Spanish Basketball Federation – FEB and was held in San Sebastián, in the Polideportivo Municipal José Antonio Gasca on February 6–7, 2016.

Bidding process
The rules of the Spanish Basketball Federation establish that the three first teams classified at the end of the first leg, together with the club representing the host province will play the Competition. If the host finishes between the three first teams, the fourth classified will also participate.

The cities of Salamanca, Huelva, Logroño, and San Sebastián bid for hosting the Cup. Finally, on December 17 2015, the Spanish Basketball Federation awarded the organization of the Cup to the city of San Sebastián, qualifying IDK Gipuzkoa as host team. This designation, done less than 48 hours prior to the last game of the first leg, and which left one spot for sporting merits less in the tournament, received critics from some clubs involved in the qualification.

Draw
The draw was held in San Sebastián on January 15, 2016.
Perfumerías Avenida and Conquero Huelva Wagen were the seeded teams and couldn't be faced each other in the semi-finals. Perfumerías Avenida was matched with Spar Citylift Girona, and Conquero Huelva Wagen with IDK Gipuzkoa.

Bracket

References and notes

External links

2016
2015–16 in Spanish women's basketball
2015–16 in Spanish basketball cups